A need is something considered, or perceived as being, necessary.

It also commonly refers to:
 need, a verb sometimes classed as one of the English modal verbs
 market demand, sometimes also dubbed market need

Entertainment
 Need (novel series), a book series launched in 2008
 "Need" (Stargate SG-1), a season two episode of the series
 The Need, a music band from Olympia, Washington, United States
 The Need, a 1998 album by MercyMe
 Need (album), by Todd Agnew
 "Need", by 8stops7 from the album Bend

Places and businesses
 Need, California, a community in the United States
 NEED, the proposed enclosure of the North Sea and the English Channel

See also
 Needs (disambiguation)
 Needy (disambiguation)
 Want (disambiguation)